Gavan may refer to:

People

First name
Gavan Daws (born 1933), American writer, historian, and filmmaker from Hawaii
Gavan Duffy (1874–1958), Canadian lawyer, judge, and political figure
Gavan Herlihy (born 1947), New Zealand politician
Gavan Horsley (born 1933), Australian rugby union player
Gavan Levenson (born 1953), South African professional golfer
Gavan McCarthy (born 1945), Australian rules footballer
Gavan McCormack, Australian researcher specializing in East Asia
Gavan McDonell (born 1932), Australian civil engineer
Gavan Moran (1936–1983), Australian rules footballer
Gavan O'Connor (born 1947), Australian politician
Gavan O'Herlihy (born 1954), Irish actor
Gavan Whelan, former member of James, an English rock band from Manchester

Last name
Alexandru Găvan (born 1982), Romanian mountain climber
John Gavan (1640–1679), English Jesuit
Paul Gavan (born 1965), Irish politician

Fictional characters
Gavan, from Space Sheriff Gavan, a Japanese TV series, and Space Sheriff Gavan: The Movie, a 2012 movie

Places
Gavan, Karnataka, India, a village
Gavan, Ardabil, Iran, a village
Gavan Municipal Okrug, a municipal okrug in Vasileostrovsky District of the federal city of St. Petersburg, Russia
Găvan River (disambiguation)

See also
Gavin, a masculine given name and a surname
Sovetskaya Gavan, a town in Khabarovsk Krai, Russia